Angus J. MacGillivray (November 3, 1865 – April 3, 1931) was a farmer and political figure in Nova Scotia, Canada. He represented Antigonish County in the Nova Scotia House of Assembly from 1920 to 1925 as a United Farmers member.

He was the son of John A. MacGillivray. In 1900, he married Mary MacIntosh. He served on the municipal council for Antigonish County and was county warden from 1916 to 1919. He lived in Dummaglass, Antigonish County.

References 
 A Directory of the Members of the Legislative Assembly of Nova Scotia, 1758-1958, Public Archives of Nova Scotia (1958)

1865 births
1931 deaths
Members of the Nova Scotia House of Assembly
Progressive Party of Canada politicians